The Louisiana Intercollegiate Conference (LIC) was an intercollegiate athletic conference that existed from 1939 to 1947, and featured institutions located in the state of Louisiana. The conference sponsored the following sports during its existence: football, track, tennis, and basketball.

Members

Notes

Football champions

1939 –  Louisiana Normal
1940 –  Southwestern Louisiana
1941 –  Louisiana Tech

1942 –  
1943 –  No champion
1944 –  Southwestern Louisiana

1945 –  Louisiana Tech
1946 –  Southeastern Louisiana
1947 –  Louisiana Tech

See also
 List of defunct college football conferences

References